Laura Juškaitė (born 22 September 1997 in Skuodas) is a Lithuanian professional female basketball player currently playing for Virtus Eirene Ragusa in the Lega Basket Femminile. Player of Lithuania women's national basketball team.

Career
On 2012 Laura Juškaitė started her career with Vilniaus „Jaunieji talentai“. On 2015 she signed a contract with Vilniaus „Kibirkštis-VIČI“ from LMKL.
2018 Laura Juškaitė started foreign player career. First club outside Lithuania was AZS AJP Gorzów Wielkopolski  (Poland). Laura played there 2 year. Won silver medal in 2018/19 season and bronze medal in 2019/20 season.
After two seasons in Poland Juškaitė signed contract with Valencia Basket (women)(Spain) who plays in Liga Femenina de Baloncesto and EuroCup Women.

References

1997 births
Living people
Lithuanian women's basketball players
Power forwards (basketball)
People from Skuodas